Royal Prince Alfred Yacht Club (RPAYC) is one of Australia's leading yacht clubs with a strong elite sailing focus located in Pittwater Newport, New South Wales.

The club was formerly located at Kirribilli before relocating to its present location on Green Point, towards the southern end of Pittwater. The club is situated to the north of Crystal Bay and across from the Newport Arms Hotel. The club maintains an adjacent slipway, hardstand and other maintenance facilities on the northern shore of Crystal Bay.

History

RPAYC was formed at a public meeting of boatowners in Sydney on 15 October 1867. Premises were built in Moore Street, now known as Martin Place.

The prefix Royal was granted by George V in 1911.

Pittwater Division was formed as a result of a decision in 1919 to investigate alternatives to racing on the increasingly congested Sydney Harbour. The original Green Point clubhouse, on the present site, was opened in 1938.

In 1956, the city clubhouse was replaced by new premises in Rowe Street.

In 1969, the Rowe Street clubhouse was sold to finance development of the Pittwater premises. While arrangements continued for some years for members to use the facilities of the Sydney Club in Rowe Street adjacent to the former city clubhouse, all remaining yachting activities were transferred to Pittwater.

Notable members

America's Cup sailors

 James Spithill (Skipper)

World records

 Kay Cottee

Olympians

 Bill Northam, International 5.5 Metre Class Gold Medal 1964
 Peter O'Donnell, International 5.5 Metre Class Gold Medal 1964
Martin Visser, International Star Class 1964
 Ian Winter, Flying Dutchman Class 1964
 Bill Solomons, International 5.5 Metre Class 1968
 John Anderson, International Star Class Gold Medal 1972
 David Forbes, International Star Class Gold Medal 1972
 Ken Berkeley, International Soling Class 1972
 Bob Miller, International Soling Class 1972
 Gordon Ingate, International Tempest Class 1972
 John Anderson, International Soling Class 1976
 David Forbes, International Soling Class 1976
 Richard Coxon, International Star Class 1984
 Colin Beashel, International Star Class 1988
 Glen Bourke, International Star Class 1988
Mike Mottl, International Soling Class 1992
 Colin Beashel, International Star Class 1992
 Glen Bourke, Finn class 1992
 Colin Beashel, International Star Class Bronze Medal 1996
 Stephen McConaghy, International Soling Class 1996
 Colin Beashel, International Star Class, Flag Bearer for Opening Ceremony 2000
 Colin Beashel, International Star Class 2004
 Iain Murray, International Star Class 2008
 Andrew Palfrey, International Star Class 2008
 Angela Farrell, Yngling Class 2008
 Nina Curtis, Elliott 6m Women's Match Racing Silver Medal 2012
 Daniel Fitzgibbon and Liesl Tesch , Two-Person Keelboat (SKUD18) Gold Medal 2012
 Jason Waterhouse, mixed Nacra 17 Silver Medal 2016

America's Cup winners
 James Spithill 2010, 2013

See also

References

External links

 RPAYC 

Royal yacht clubs
Yacht clubs in New South Wales
1867 establishments in Australia
Sports clubs established in 1867
Newport, New South Wales
Organisations based in Australia with royal patronage